The Nigeria leaf-toed gecko (Hemidactylus ansorgii) is a species of lizard in the family Gekkonidae. The species is native to western Africa.

Etymology
The specific name, ansorgii, is in honor of William John Ansorge, a physician who collected natural history specimens in Africa.

Geographic range
H. ansorgii is found in Benin, Cameroon, Ghana, Ivory Coast, Liberia, Nigeria, and Togo.

Reproduction
H. ansorgii is oviparous.

References

Further reading
Boulenger GA (1901). "Description of a new Gecko from the Niger Delta". Annals and Magazine of Natural History, Seventh Series 7: 204. (Hemidactylus ansongii, new species).
Rösler H (2000). "Kommentierte Liste der rezent, subrezent und fossil bekannten Geckotaxa (Reptilia: Gekkonomorpha)". Gekkota 2: 28–153. (in German).
Trape J-F, Trape S, Chirio L (2012). Lézards, crocodiles et tortues d'Afrique occidentale et du Sahara. Paris: IRD Orstom. 503 pp. . (in French).

Hemidactylus
Taxa named by George Albert Boulenger
Reptiles described in 1901